Charles R. Embry is Professor Emeritus of Political Science at Texas A&M University–Commerce, he joined then East Texas State University in 1969. Dr. Embry has just published The Philosopher and the Storyteller: Eric Voegelin and Twentieth-Century Literature, University of Missouri Press, . Dr. Embry previously edited the following two books; Robert B. Heilman and Eric Voegelin: A Friendship in Letters, 1944–1984 and coeditor of Philosophy, Literature, and Politics: Essays Honoring Ellis Sandoz.

Dr. Embry studied under Ellis Sandoz at Louisiana Tech University and John Hallowell at Duke University and is an active member in the Eric Voegelin Society, presenting at many annual meetings.

In 2005 Dr. Embry was the chair for a panel titled, The Evocation of Experience: Poetry and Eric Voegelin's Theory of Symbolization at the Eric Voegelin Society Conference in Washington D.C.

In 2004 Dr. Embry presented “The Literary Criticism of Eric Voegelin in his Correspondence with Robert B. Heilman” at the 20th Annual Eric Voegelin Society conference held in Chicago, Illinois.

In 2003 Dr. Embry presented "Show me something snaky" at the annual meeting of the American Political Science Association, Philadelphia Marriott Hotel, Philadelphia, PA.

References

External links

Below are links to Dr. Embry's published work on Eric Voegelin available through the University of Missouri Press:
The Philosopher and the Storyteller
Philosophy, Literature, and Politics
Robert B. Heilman and Eric Voegelin

Texas A&M University faculty
Louisiana Tech University alumni
Living people
Year of birth missing (living people)
American political scientists